The 2005 Russian football season, saw CSKA Moscow competed in the Russian Premier League, Russian Cup, two editions of the UEFA Cup and the UEFA Super Cup.
CSKA won the Russian Premier League, Russian Cup and the 2004-05 UEFA Cup, earn them a historic treble. As a result of winning the UEFA Cup they faced Liverpool in the 2005 UEFA Super Cup, which they lost 3–1.

Squad

Out on loan

Transfers

Winter

In:

Out:

Summer

In:

Out:

Competitions

Russian Premier League

Results by round

Results

League table

Russian Cup

2004–05

2005–06

Round 16 took place during the 2006 season.

UEFA Cup

2004–05

Knock-out stage

Final

2005–06

First round

Group stage

UEFA Super Cup

Statistics

Appearances and goals

|-
|colspan="14"|Players that left CSKA Moscow on loan during the season:

|-
|colspan="14"|Players who appeared for CSKA Moscow no longer at the club:

|}

Goal Scorers

Disciplinary Record

References

Results

PFC CSKA Moscow seasons
CSKA Moscow
2004-05 Pfc Cska Moscow Season
Russian football championship-winning seasons